John Lancaster may refer to:

John de Lancaster (MP), Member of Parliament (MP) for Lancashire in 1316
John Lancaster (died 1424), MP for Suffolk (1407–1414) and Norfolk (1419, 1421–1412)
John Lancaster (died 1434), MP for Cumberland and Westmorland
John Lancaster (bishop) (died 1619), 17th-century Anglican Bishop of Waterford and Lismore in Ireland
John Lancaster (MP) (1816–1884), MP for Wigan
John Lancaster (writer) (born 1946), British poet and writer
John L. Lancaster, President of the Texas and Pacific Railroad during the first half of the 20th century
John Lancaster (Royal Navy officer) (1903–1992)

See also
Jon Lancaster (born 1988), racing driver
Jack Lancaster, composer